Asian Americans started to become a significant part of the Washington metropolitan area in the late twentieth century.

Fairfax County, Virginia, Montgomery County, Maryland, and Arlington, Virginia are the largest jurisdictions with high concentrations of Asian Americans in the region:

Fairfax County
Korean – 3%
Indian – 3%
Vietnamese – 3%
Chinese – 2%
Filipino – 1%
Montgomery County
Chinese – 3%
Indian – 3%
Korean – 2%
Vietnamese – 1%
Filipino – 1%
Arlington County
Indian – 2%
Chinese – 2%
Filipino – 2%
Korean – 1%
Japanese – 1%

Washington area racial composition
The area has been a destination for international immigration since the late 1960s. It also attracts internal migration from other parts of the U.S.

Racial composition of the Washington, D.C. area:

2006
 White: 51.7%
 Black: 26.3%
 Asian: 8.4%
 Hispanic: 11.6%
 Mixed and Other: 2.0%

1980
 White: 67.8%
 Black: 26.0%
 Asian: 2.5%
 Hispanic: 2.8%
 Mixed and Other: 0.9%

Counties/county equivalents by number of Asian Americans
Washington-Arlington-Alexandria, DC-VA-MD-WV Metropolitan Division
Fairfax County, Virginia – 126,038
Prince George's County, Maryland – 31,032 	
Arlington County, Virginia – 16,327
Washington, D.C. – 15,189
Loudoun County, Virginia – 9,067
Prince William County, Virginia – 10,701
Alexandria, Virginia – 7,249
Fairfax, Virginia – 2,617
Charles County, Maryland – 2,192
Stafford County, Virginia – 1,512 	
Spotsylvania County, Virginia – 1,243 	
Manassas, Virginia – 1,206 	
Falls Church, Virginia – 675
Calvert County, Maryland – 655
Manassas Park, Virginia – 418
Fauquier County, Virginia – 324
Fredericksburg, Virginia – 291
Jefferson County, West Virginia – 252
Warren County, Virginia – 136
Clarke County, Virginia – 62
Bethesda-Gaithersburg-Frederick, MD Metropolitan Division
Montgomery County, Maryland – 98,651
Frederick County, Maryland – 3,269

Counties/county equivalents by percentage of Asian Americans (Census 2000)
Washington-Arlington-Alexandria, DC-VA-MD-WV Metropolitan Division (4,000,206)
Fairfax County, Virginia (969,749) 13.00%
Fairfax, Virginia (21,498) 12.17%
Arlington County, Virginia (189,453) 8.62%
Falls Church, Virginia (10,377) 6.50%
Alexandria, Virginia (128,283) 5.65%
Loudoun County, Virginia (169,599) 5.35%
Manassas Park, Virginia (10,290) 4.06%
Prince George's County, Maryland (846,123) 3.87%
Prince William County, Virginia (280,813) 3.81%
Manassas, Virginia (35,135) 3.43%
Washington, D.C. (572,059) 3.17%
Charles County, Maryland (120,546) 1.82%
Stafford County, Virginia (92,446) 1.64%
Fredericksburg, Virginia (19,279) 1.51%
Spotsylvania County, Virginia (90,395) 1.38%
Calvert County, Maryland (74,563) 0.88%
Jefferson County, West Virginia (42,190) 0.60%
Fauquier County, Virginia (55,139) 0.59%
Clarke County, Virginia (12,652 ) 0.49%
Warren County, Virginia (31,584) 0.43%
Bethesda-Gaithersburg-Frederick, MD Metropolitan Division (1,139,343)
Montgomery County, Maryland (873,341) 11.30%
Frederick County, Maryland (195,277) 1.67%

References

Asian-American culture in Maryland
Asian-American culture in Virginia
Asian-American culture in Washington, D.C.
Asian-American culture in West Virginia
Demographics of Maryland
Demographics of Virginia
Demographics of Washington, D.C.